Le Vamp is an endless runner developed and published by High Voltage Software for iOS and Android in 2013.

Reception

The iOS version received average reviews according to the review aggregation website Metacritic.

References

2013 video games
Android (operating system) games
Endless runner games
High Voltage Software games
IOS games
Single-player video games
Video games about vampires
Video games developed in the United States
Video games set in France